John Best (fl. 1590s) was an Englishman who held the government post of Captain of the Yeomen of the Guard from 1592 until 1597, described as 'Champion of England' replacing Sir Walter Raleigh.

References

Year of death unknown
16th-century English soldiers
16th-century births